Gangnam Beltway is an urban expressway located in Seoul, South Korea.

Stopovers
 Seoul
 Geumcheon District - Gwanak District - Seocho District

List of Facilities 

IC : Interchange (나들목)JC : Junction (분기점)TG : Tollgate (요금소)TN : Tunnel (터널)

 (■): Motorway section

See also 
 Roads and expressways in South Korea
 Transportation in South Korea

External links 
 MOLIT South Korean Government Transport Department

References

2016 establishments in South Korea
Transport in Seoul
Roads in Seoul